Djilali Abdi (25 November 1943 – 2 February 2022) was an Algerian footballer who played as a midfielder. He made six appearances for the Algeria national team from 1967 to 1969. He was also named in Algeria's squad for the 1968 African Cup of Nations tournament. He died on 2 February 2022, at the age of 78.

References

External links
 

1943 births
2022 deaths
21st-century Algerian people
Algerian footballers
Association football midfielders
Algeria international footballers
1968 African Cup of Nations players
USM Bel Abbès players
People from Sidi Bel Abbès